The 2019 RBC Pro Challenge was a professional tennis tournament played on outdoor hard courts. It was the third edition of the tournament which was part of the 2019 ITF Women's World Tennis Tour. It took place in Tyler, Texas, United States between 28 October and 3 November 2019.

Singles main-draw entrants

Seeds

 1 Rankings are as of 21 October 2019.

Other entrants
The following players received wildcards into the singles main draw:
  Alexa Glatch
  Jamie Loeb
  Grace Min
  CoCo Vandeweghe

The following player received entry using a protected ranking:
  Irina Falconi

The following players received entry from the qualifying draw:
  Katharine Fahey
  Lorraine Guillermo
  Sanaz Marand
  Giuliana Olmos
  Estela Pérez Somarriba
  Stephanie Wagner
  Sophia Whittle
  Marcela Zacarías

The following player received entry as a lucky loser:
  Vladica Babić

Champions

Singles

 Mandy Minella def.  Alexa Glatch, 6–4, 6–4

Doubles

 Beatrice Gumulya /  Jessy Rompies def.  Hsu Chieh-yu /  Marcela Zacarías, 6–2, 6–3

References

External links
 2019 RBC Pro Challenge at ITFtennis.com
 Official website 

2019 ITF Women's World Tennis Tour
2019 in American tennis
October 2019 sports events in the United States
November 2019 sports events in the United States